Club Deportivo Elgoibar is a football team based in Elgoibar in the autonomous community of Basque Country. Founded in 1917, it plays in the Tercera División – Group 4. Its stadium is Mintxeta with a capacity of 4,000 seats.

Season to season

3 seasons in Segunda División B
28 seasons in Tercera División

Famous players
 José Araquistáin
 Juan Cruz Sol
 Joseba Etxeberria

External links
Official website 
Futbolme team profile 

Football clubs in the Basque Country (autonomous community)
Association football clubs established in 1917
1917 establishments in Spain
Sport in Gipuzkoa